Two Guns may refer to:

 2 Guns, a 2013 American action comedy film by Baltasar Kormákur
 Two Guns, Arizona